Hamburger Theaterfestival is a theatre festival in Germany.

External links
 

Theatre festivals in Germany
Events in Hamburg
Festivals in Hamburg